Amira El Fadil (born 15 January 1967) is a Sudanese government official.

She previously held the position of Minister of Social Welfare and Social Insurance for the Government of Sudan. In 2016, she was elected to a four-year term as Commissioner for Social Affairs of the African Union Commission. She is also a member of the executive board of the World Anti-Doping Agency.

El Fadil has worked with the Association of Women for Rural Development and Immigration, Women, Children and Family. She has participated in the Women's Rally for Peace and led workshops on peacebuilding and conflict resolution.

References 

1967 births
Living people
21st-century Sudanese women politicians
21st-century Sudanese politicians
African Union Commission members
World Anti-Doping Agency members